At the 1908 Summer Olympics, four fencing events were contested.

The 1908 Games were the first to lack a foil competition.  Foil fencing, "not being in the opinion of the organisers a form of sport which is improved by competition," was held only as a display.  The 1908 Olympics did introduce team sabre and épée competitions.  As in the 1904 edition, the London Games held no events for masters; all fencing was done by amateurs.

Medal summary

Participating nations
131 fencers from 14 nations competed.

Medal table

References

 
1908
1908 Summer Olympics events
1908 in fencing
International fencing competitions hosted by the United Kingdom